John-Patrick Smith and Matt Reid were the defending champions, however they chose not to participate with each other. Smith partners Adam Hubble, whilst Reid partners Jose Statham.

Adam Hubble and John-Patrick Smith won the title by defeating Peter Polansky and Adil Shamasdin 6–3, 6–2 in the final.

Seeds

Draw

References
 Main Draw
 Qualifying Draw

Sacramento Challenger - Doubles
Singles